Dom Santamaria (born 5 December 1979, Melbourne, Australia) is the drummer from the Ballarat-based band Epicure.

Biography

Santamaria began playing drums in 1992, as part of Epicure (band) between 1996 and 2010. Some major influences in his early years as a drummer were bands such as Ugly Kid Joe, Tool, Radiohead and Faith No More.

Santamaria has been involved in various side-projects including 'MC SANTA and the WACK ATTACK', "Strawberry Hick" and also filmed, edited and produced the underground documentary 'A Pygmy Tribe' which explored the Ballarat music scene in 2001.

References

Australian drummers
Male drummers
Living people
1979 births
21st-century drummers
21st-century Australian male musicians
21st-century Australian musicians